Playa de Gulpiyuri is a flooded sinkhole with an inland beach located near Llanes, in Asturias Northern Spain, around 100 m from the Cantabrian Sea. It is the shortest beach in the world.

Roughly 40 meters in length, it is fully tidal due to a series of tunnels carved by the salt water of the Cantabrian Sea, which allows water from the Bay of Biscay to create small waves.

The word ‘Gulpiyuri’ means ‘water circle’. Unlike many other hidden beaches around the world, Playa de Gulpiyuri is actually fully tidal and even has waves bathing the small strip of sand. The crystal clear water may be a little cold after remaining underground for a while before getting to Gulpiyuri Beach.

It is a popular tourist destination, natural monument, and part of Spain's Regional Network of Protected Natural Areas.

See also
 Blowhole
 Bufones De Arenillas
 Bufones De Pría
 Pría
 Villanueva de Pría

References

Sinkholes of Europe
Landforms of Spain
Natural monuments
Beaches of Spain